Herschel is a 304 kilometer impact crater in the Martian southern hemisphere, at 14.5°S, 130°E, located in the Mare Tyrrhenum region of Mars. The crater is jointly named after the seventeenth/eighteenth century father and son astronomers William Herschel and John Herschel.

Moving Sand Dunes 

Mars Global Surveyor spacecraft originally photographed fields of dark sand dunes within Herschel. Images from the NASA Mars Reconnaissance Orbiter showed that sand dunes on the floor of the Herschel crater are not stationary (as previously believed), but moved over time. Images from photos taken by the Orbiter's High Resolution Imaging Science Experiment (HiRISE) on March 3, 2007 and December 1, 2010 show clear shifting of dunes and ripples.  Research published in Icarus stated that the dunes in Hershel Crater moved  0.8 m  in a time span of 3.7 Earth-years. Also, it was determined that dune ripple moved 1.1 m in that time period.

References

See also 
 List of craters on Mars

Impact craters on Mars
Mare Tyrrhenum quadrangle